Grays is a hamlet within the civil parish of Chislet, near Canterbury, Kent. It is located to the south of the A299 road and is located on the North Stream, a tributary of the River Wantsum. The hamlet consists of a small collection of houses (Little Grays) and the moated Grays Farm. On the A299 is the large public house named the Roman Galley.

Hamlets in Kent
City of Canterbury